Carne Blacklock (30 January 1884 – 30 January 1924) was a New Zealand cricketer. He played in two first-class matches for Wellington in 1905/06.

See also
 List of Wellington representative cricketers

References

External links
 

1884 births
1924 deaths
New Zealand cricketers
Wellington cricketers
Cricketers from Wellington City